Gregorio Guglielmi (13 December 1714, Rome - 2 February 1773, Saint Petersburg) was an Italian-born fresco painter who worked primarily in Germany.

Biography 
His artistic education concluded with lessons from Francesco Trevisani, but he was already turning toward the Academic style of Sebastiano Conca, with whom he may also have studied. There are some indications that he studied in Paris during the 1740s and became acquainted with Claude Joseph Vernet. Early on, he obtained the patronage of Cardinal Alessandro Albani and may have also been supported by Cardinal Neri Maria Corsini.

In 1752, he was invited to Naples by the architect, Ferdinando Fuga, but court intrigues prevented him from obtaining any major commissions. However, Queen Maria Amalia introduced him to her father, Elector Frederick Augustus II, who arranged for him to work in Dresden.

His Academic inclinations were enhanced in Germany; where he met Pietro Metastasio. In 1755, he created frescoes, inspired by Metastasio, at what is now the Austrian Academy of Sciences, and in Schönbrunn Palace, upon commission by the Sardinian ambassador, Luigi Gerolamo Malabaila (1704-1773). The latter were heavily damaged in World War II. In 1764, at the invitation of a painter named Sophonia De Derichs (1712-1773), he was working in Berlin. A major project, proposed by King Stanisław August Poniatowski for Ujazdów Castle never came to fruition.

He then went back to Germany, creating frescoes for the main hallway at the Schaezlerpalais in Augsburg.

As early as 1767, he had submitted drawings to the Russian court in Saint Petersburg. In 1770, he was finally called there by Catherine the Great, assisted by the De Derichs, who had already established themselves at the court. But, except for some portraits, his work there never progressed beyond the initial sketches. In fact, it was said (by the sculptor, Étienne Maurice Falconet), that he died of a "putrid fever" after Catherine severely criticized a portrait of her. For some commentators, the fact that he and De Derichs died on the same day, followed by De Derichs' wife the day after, suggests that they were poisoned. No motive has been proposed, although Falconet's comment may indicate that he was not well-liked.

References

Further reading 
 Edith Gabrielli; Gregorio Guglielmi: pittore romano del Settecento (exhibition catalog) Istituto poligrafico e Zecca dello Stato, Libreria dello Stato, 2009 
 Stefanie von Langen; Die Fresken von Gregorio Guglielmi, Tuduv-Verlag, 1994

External links 

 Biography from the Dizionario Biografico degli Italiani @ Treccani 
 Guglielmi @ the Artcyclopedia
 More works by Guglielmi @ ArtNet

1714 births
1773 deaths
Italian painters
Fresco painters
Painters from Rome
Italian emigrants to Germany